Me and My Drummer are an indie pop duo from Berlin.

Charlotte Brandi and Matze Pröllochs met in Tübingen, Germany. Both worked in a theatre as stage musicians and their musical inspirations brought them together.

In 2011 they began to record their debut The Hawk, The Beak, The Prey at Radio Buellebrueck Studio by Tobias Siebert. It was released in 2012 by Sinnbus.

The band's second album Love Is a Fridge was released in February 2016.

Discography

Albums 
The Hawk, The Beak, The Prey (2012)
Love Is a Fridge (2016)

Singles 
"You're a Runner" (2012)
"Heavy Weight" (2012)
"Don't Be So Hot" (2012)
"Blue Splinter View" (2015)
"Pentonville Road" (2016)
"Gun" (2016)
"Bloodmoon" (2017)

References

External links
Management website
BBC artist page

German art rock groups
German indie rock groups
Musical groups from Berlin
Musical groups established in 2011
2011 establishments in Germany